Roundhill Ski Area is a family owned and run ski area in Canterbury, New Zealand, in the Two Thumb Range near the town of Lake Tekapo, 1.5 hours from Timaru and 3 hours from both Christchurch & Queenstown.
The main runs are accessed by a 1.2 kilometre long T-bar (T1) and a shorter T-bar (T2). The ski area caters primarily to beginner and intermediate skiers with extensive use of two snow grooming machines. This opened up a large ungroomed advanced area for skilled skiers and boarders. The Heritage Express is reportedly the longest rope tow in the world. 

The trails have a difficulty distribution of 35% advanced, 45% intermediate & 20% beginners.

References

External links
 Roundhill Ski Area, official website
 Trail map
 "Roundhill, For Mum, Dad & the Kids", review

Ski areas and resorts in Canterbury, New Zealand
Mackenzie District